Adrien Étienne Pierre, comte de Gasparin (June 29, 1783 in Orange, Vaucluse – September 7, 1862 in Orange, Vaucluse) was a French statesman and agriculturist.

Biography
He entered the army, but was soon compelled by illness to give up military life. After the revolution of 1830 he was made successively prefect of the departments of Loire and Isère, and in 1831 of Rhône. For his promptness in suppressing an insurrection at Lyons in 1834, he was raised to the peerage. He became minister of the interior in 1836, and gave his attention especially to prison reforms and the establishment of hospitals. He occupied the same position in the short-lived cabinet of March 1839. In 1848 he accepted the management of the national agricultural institute at Versailles. The institute was abolished in 1852.

Literary works
He published a large number of papers and several extended works on agricultural subjects, the principal of which is Cours d'agriculture (5 vols., Paris, 1843–49).

Family
His father Thomas-Augustin de Gasparin was a military officer in the French Revolutionary army and a member of the Committee of Public Safety. His son Agénor de Gasparin was a noted politician and author, who emigrated to Geneva.

Notes

References

1783 births
1862 deaths
People from Orange, Vaucluse
Counts of France
French Protestants
Politicians from Provence-Alpes-Côte d'Azur
French interior ministers
French Ministers of Commerce and Public works
Members of the 1st Chamber of Deputies of the July Monarchy
Members of the Chamber of Peers of the July Monarchy
Prefects of Isère
Prefects of Rhône (department)
French non-fiction writers
Members of the French Academy of Sciences
French male non-fiction writers